Giga Tkhilaishvili (born 8 April 1991) is a Georgian rugby union player. His position is flanker, and he currently plays for Batumi RC in the Georgia Championship and the Georgia national team.

Career 
Giga Tkhilaishvili played for Batumi RC in the Georgian championship. After some strong performances, he was called by the U20 national team to play the JWRT. Few months later he joined the 2011 champion of Georgia, Armia Tbilisi. He made his debut for Georgia national team against Ukraine in June 2012. In October, he had a one-month trial for the Premiership's side Leicester Tigers, after a prior trial with Northampton. He impressed in defense with Leicester A in the A-League, but his inability to speak English and his absence for international matches led to him not receiving a long-term contract.

References

1991 births
Living people
Rugby union players from Georgia (country)
Sportspeople from Batumi
Rugby union flankers
Batumi RC players
Expatriate rugby union players from Georgia (country)
Expatriate sportspeople from Georgia (country) in England
Georgia international rugby union players
The Black Lion players